Pong Cheuk Hei (born 31 January 2004) is a Hong Kong professional footballer who currently plays as a goalkeeper for Hong Kong Premier League club HK U23, on loan from Resources Capital.

Career statistics

Club

Notes

References

Living people
2004 births
Hong Kong footballers
Hong Kong youth international footballers
Association football goalkeepers
Hong Kong Premier League players
Resources Capital FC players
HK U23 Football Team players